Viva Duets is a studio album by Tony Bennett, released in October 2012. The album is sung in English, Spanish and Portuguese; and features Latin American singers. Album's adaptations were written by Andres Castro, Edgar Barrera, Miguel Bosé, Ricardo Arjona, Kany Garcia, Thalia, Franco De Vita, Dani Martin, and Mario Molina Montez.

Track listing

Charts

See also
 Tony Bennett discography

References

2012 albums
Columbia Records albums
Latin music albums by American artists
Tony Bennett albums
Vocal duet albums